Jolene Marie Siana (born June 10, 1969) is an American author of Go Ask Ogre: Letters from a Deathrock Cutter, published by Process Media (2005).

Early life and education

Jolene was born in Toledo, Ohio to a single mother in 1969. She attended The University of Toledo for one year and then transferred to The Art Institute of Pittsburgh where she was able to focus exclusively on Photography. 
After graduating from art school, she relocated to Los Angeles, where she wrote and published her memoir, Go Ask Ogre. 
Jolene moved from Los Angeles to New York City in 2006.

Awards 
 Finalist: Best Juvenile/Teen Young Adult Non-fiction, 2006 Independent Publisher Awards: Go Ask Ogre by Jolene Siana
 2006 New York Public Library Books for the Teen Age

Bibliography 
 ''Go Ask Ogre: Letters from a Deathrock Cutter"  
Brooklyn Public Library 
Good Reads; Go Ask Ogre

References 

Shoutout LA; Meet Jolene Siana, Photographer + Author
LA Weekly; Feral Child 
LA Times; A happy ending to life’s dark chapter
Tom Tom Magazine; Lydia Lunch photographed by Jolene Siana
Shooting Star Mag; Go Ask Ogre:Jolene Siana
Litpark by Susan Henderson with Jolene Siana
Stomp and Stammer; Peter Murphy photographed by Jolene Siana
Revolver Mag; Youth Code Photographed by Jolene Siana  
Revolver Mag; Ministry including photos by Jolene Siana  
Adweek/Photos by Jolene Siana

External links

 Official website/Jolene Siana.com
 Lethal Amounts/Her Little Goth Heart
 This Magazine: To Ogre, With Love
 Josie The Reading Witch Review
 Vermin On The Mount series with Jim Rudland

1969 births
Writers from Toledo, Ohio
American writers of young adult literature
Living people
American women children's writers
American children's writers
21st-century American women